The men's 110 metres hurdles at the 2012 World Junior Championships in Athletics was held at the Estadi Olímpic Lluís Companys on 10–12 July.

Medalists

Records
, the existing world junior and championship records were as follows.

Results

Heats

Qualification: The first 2 of each heat (Q) and the 8 fastest times (q) qualified

Semi-final

Qualification: The first 2 of each heat (Q) and the 2 fastest times (q) qualified

Final

Participation
According to an unofficial count, 56 athletes from 42 countries participated in the event.

References

External links
WJC12 110 metres hurdles schedule

110 metres hurdles
Sprint hurdles at the World Athletics U20 Championships